California's 3rd congressional district is a U.S. congressional district in California. It includes the northern Sierra Nevada and northeastern suburbs of Sacramento, stretching south to Death Valley. It encompasses Alpine, Inyo, Mono, Nevada, Placer, Plumas, and Sierra counties, as well as parts of El Dorado, Sacramento, and Yuba counties. It includes the Sacramento suburbs of Roseville (the district's largest city), Folsom, Orangevale, Rocklin, and Lincoln, and the mountain towns of Quincy, South Lake Tahoe, Truckee, Mammoth Lakes, and Bishop. The district is represented by Republican Kevin Kiley.

Prior to redistricting in 2020, the 3rd district encompassed most of the Sacramento Valley north and west of Sacramento. It covered all of Colusa, Sutter and Yuba counties, most of Glenn, Lake, Solano and Yolo counties and a portion of Sacramento County. The district was represented by John Garamendi, a Democrat.

Recent history

Recent election results from statewide races

Prior to 2012 

The 3rd district once extended up the Sacramento Valley from Sacramento to take in rural territory up to Tehama County.

Once a Democratic bastion, the district was pushed into more rural and Republican-leaning territory after the 1990 census, and finally elected a Republican in 1998. The 2001 reapportionment made the district more compact and Republican than its predecessor, though it was far less Republican than the neighboring 4th district. Although there was some movement in registration in favor of the Democrats, it still had a strong GOP flavor as most of the Sacramento area's Democratic voters lived in the neighboring 5th district.

While George W. Bush carried the district in 2004 with 58.2% of the vote, the district swung rapidly in the Democratic column in 2008 with Barack Obama narrowly winning a plurality with 49.28% of the vote over John McCain's 48.81%. However, despite Obama's win, in the congressional election held on the same day the Republicans retained the seat.

After redistricting, this district essentially became the 7th district, while a new 3rd was created with lines similar to what the old 3rd had in the 1990s. This version of the 3rd was considered a swing district, though the bulk of its population lives in Democratic-leaning areas in the outer Bay Area and in the closer-in suburbs of Sacramento.

Election results from statewide races before 2012

Composition as of 2023

As of the 2020 redistricting, California's 3rd congressional district is located in the Sierra Nevada region. It encompasses Alpine, Inyo, Mono, Nevada, Placer, Plumas, and Sierra Counties, as well as parts of El Dorado, Sacramento, and Yuba Counties.

El Dorado County is split between this district and the 5th district. They are partitioned by Scott Creek, Perry Creek, Perry Creek Rd, Rocky Bar Rd, Grizzly Flat Rd, Happy Valley Rd, Canon Creek, E16 Highway, Pleasant Valley Rd, Cedar Ravine Rd, Woodland Dr, Weber Creek, Highway 50, Chili Bar Reservoir, South Fork American River, Marshall Rd, Hastings Creek, Highway 49, Pilot Creek, North Fork American River, and the Folsom Lake State Recreation Area. The 3rd district takes in the city of South Lake Tahoe.

Sacramento County is split between this district and both the 6th district and 7th district. The 6th and 3rd districts are partitioned by Latrobe Rd, Scott Rd, Deer Creek, Carson Creek, Nimbus Rd, E3 Highway, Illinois Ave, Madison Ave, Kenneth Ave, Wachtel Way, and Old Auburn Rd. The 3rd district takes in the city of Folsom and the census-designated place of Orangevale.

Yuba County is split between this district and the 1st district. They are partitioned by State Highway 70, Ellis Rd, and Union Pacific. The 3rd district takes in the city of Wheatland, and the census-designated places of Linda, Olivehurst, and Plumas Lake.

Cities & CDP with 10,000 or more people
 Roseville - 141,500
 Rocklin - 68,823
 Lincoln - 48,275
 South Lake Tahoe - 21,330
 Granite Bay - 20,402
 Truckee - 16,735
 Auburn - 13,776
 North Auburn - 13,022
 Grass Valley - 12,817

2,500-10,000 people
 Alta Sierra - 7,204
 Mammoth Lakes - 7,191
 Pollock Pines - 7,112
 Loomis - 6,836
 Lake Wildwood - 4,991
 Lake of the Pines - 3,917
 Bishop - 3,819
 Nevada City - 3,148
 Dixon Lane-Meadow Creek - 2,780
 West Bishop - 2,607

List of members representing the district

Election results

1864

1867

1868

1871

1872

1875

1876

1879

1880

1882

1884

1886

1888

1890

1892 (Special)

1894

1896

1898

1900

1902

1904 (Special)

1906

1908

1910

1912

1914

1916

1918

1920

1922

1924

1926

1928

1930

1932

1934

1936

1938

1940

1942

1944

1946

1948

1950

1952

1954

1956

1958

1960

1962

1964

1966

1968

1970

1972

1974

1976

1978

1980

1982

1984

1986

1988

1990

1992

1994

1996

1998

2000

2002

2004

2006

2008

2010

2012

2014

2016

2018

2020

2022

Historical district boundaries

See also
List of United States congressional districts

References

External links
GovTrack.us: California's 3rd congressional district
RAND California Election Returns: District Definitions (out of date)
California Voter Foundation map - CD03 (out of date)
California Citizens Redistricting Commission, final districts 

03
Government of Colusa County, California
Government of Glenn County, California
Government of Lake County, California
Government of Sacramento County, California
Government of Solano County, California
Government of Sutter County, California
Government of Yolo County, California
Government of Yuba County, California
Sacramento Valley
Colusa, California
Davis, California
Marysville, California
Vacaville, California
Willows, California
Winters, California
Woodland, California
Yuba City, California
Constituencies established in 1865
1865 establishments in California